Christopher Machiel van Zyl (born 12 July 1986 in Cape Town) is a former South African rugby union player for the  in Super Rugby and  in the Currie Cup. His regular position is lock.

Career

Amateur

He played some Varsity Cup rugby, representing  in the 2011 Varsity Cup competition and making three appearances.

He then moved to Johannesburg, where he played amateur rugby for Pirates, also captaining the side.

Senior career

He joined the  senior side in 2013. He made a further two appearances in the 2013 Vodacom Cup competition.

References

South African rugby union players
Living people
1986 births
Rugby union players from Cape Town
Golden Lions players
Rugby union locks
Western Province (rugby union) players
Stormers players